The Black Dahlia is a 2006 neo-noir crime thriller film directed by Brian De Palma, written by Josh Friedman, and starring Josh Hartnett, Scarlett Johansson, Aaron Eckhart, Hilary Swank, and Mia Kirshner. It is an adaptation of the 1987 novel of the same name by James Ellroyin turn drawn from the widely sensationalized murder of Elizabeth Shortand follows two Los Angeles Police Department detectives investigating the crime, leading them through a series of shocking revelations. Mike Starr, Fiona Shaw, John Kavanagh, Rachel Miner, and Rose McGowan appear in supporting roles.

Ellroy's novel was optioned a decade prior to De Palma's involvement, with David Fincher attached to direct a feature film adaptation for a years-long span. After Fincher dropped out of the project, De Palma was hired as director. Principal photography began in Pernik and Sofia, Bulgaria in April 2005, with additional location photography in Los Angeles, California.

The film was screened at the 63rd Venice International Film Festival on August 30, 2006, and was released in the United States on September 15, 2006. It was a box-office flop and met with largely negative critical reaction, effectively ousting De Palma from the Hollywood studio system (his subsequent films have been filmed and financed overseas). Despite its critical and financial failure, Vilmos Zsigmond's cinematography earned the film a nomination for Best Cinematography at the 79th Academy Awards, and Kirshner's performance as Short was widely praised.

Plot
LAPD Detectives Dwight "Bucky" Bleichert and Lee Blanchard are paired as partners after engaging in a boxing match to raise funds for the department. Lee introduces Bucky to his girlfriend Kay Lake, and the trio becomes inseparable. Bucky is shocked when Kay tells him she isn't sleeping with Lee, and later tries to seduce him, but he refuses. He also discovers that Kay has been branded with the initials "BD", for Bobby DeWitt, the gangster whose arrest and conviction for a big bank robbery made Lee's career.

Soon after, on January 15, 1947, Elizabeth Short's dismembered body is found and she is dubbed "The Black Dahlia" by the press. Both detectives become obsessed with solving the case.

Bucky learns that Elizabeth was an aspiring actress who appeared in a pornographic film and hung out with lesbians. He goes to a lesbian nightclub and meets Madeleine Linscott, who looks very much like Elizabeth. Madeleine, who comes from a prominent family, tells Bucky that she was 'very close' with Elizabeth but asks him to keep her name out of the papers in exchange for sexual favors. She introduces him to her wealthy parents almost immediately.

Lee's obsession leads him to become erratic and abusive toward Kay. After Lee and Bucky have a nasty argument about a previous case, Bucky goes to Lee and Kay's to apologize, only to learn from Kay that Lee was responding to a tip about Bobby DeWitt. Bucky finds DeWitt in the atrium of a building before he is gunned down by Lee, then sees a man garrote Lee before a second figure steps out and slits Lee's throat. Lee and the man holding the rope fall over the railing to their deaths several floors below.

The grief of losing Lee propels Bucky and Kay into having sex. The next morning, Bucky finds money hidden in Lee and Kay's bathroom. Kay reveals that she had been DeWitt's girlfriend and that he abused her. Lee rescued Kay, stole DeWitt's money, and put DeWitt behind bars. Bucky realizes Lee was there to kill DeWitt and leaves, furious, to return to Madeleine, where he notices a painting of a leering clown. Kay follows him and she is appalled to see Madeleine's striking resemblance to the Dahlia.

Bucky starts putting the pieces together and remembers props in another movie matched the set in Elizabeth's pornographic film. The end credits thanked Emmett Linscott, Madeleine's father, and Bucky digs deeper into a story Madeleine told about him using old film sets to build cheap firetrap housing. In an empty house below the Hollywoodland sign built by Emmett, Bucky recognizes the set that was used in Elizabeth's film. He finds evidence in a barn on the property that Elizabeth was killed and butchered there, as well as a drawing of a man with a Glasgow smile. The drawing matches the painting in Madeleine's home and the gruesome smile carved into Elizabeth's face.

Bucky confronts Madeleine and her father in their home and Madeleine's mother, Ramona, reveals that she killed Elizabeth. She confesses that Madeleine was not fathered by Emmett but rather by his best friend, Georgie. She says Georgie became infatuated while watching Elizabeth film the pornography. Ramona was disturbed by the idea of George having sex with someone who looked so much like his own daughter, and lured Elizabeth to the house and killed her. Before Bucky can decide what to do, Ramona shoots herself.

A few days later, remembering something Lee said during the investigation, Bucky visits Madeleine's sister Martha with some questions. He learns that Lee knew about Madeleine and Elizabeth, and blackmailed Madeleine's father to keep it secret. Bucky finds Madeleine at a seedy motel, and she admits to being the one who slit Lee's throat. Although she insists that Bucky wants to have sex with her rather than kill her, he tells her she is wrong and shoots her dead. Bucky goes to Kay's house and she invites him in and closes the door.

Cast

Musician k.d. lang has an uncredited cameo as the floor show performer at the lesbian nightclub Laverne's Hideaway.

Production

Development
James B. Harris optioned the film rights to the novel shortly after it was published in 1987. He planned to direct the adaptation and completed a script before abandoning the project to make another film. The project then languished in development hell for several years. In 1997, L.A. Confidential, the third book in Ellroy's L.A. Quartet, was adapted into a critically acclaimed and highly successful film of the same name. Its success resulted in several studios becoming interested in adapting Ellroy's other novels. Universal acquired the rights to The Black Dahlia shortly after the release of L.A. Confidential. Josh Friedman was hired to write the screenplay. Friedman has claimed that he worked on the script from 1997 to 2005. His original script featured a cameo appearance by Russell Crowe and Guy Pearce, reprising their roles as Bud White and Edmund Exley respectively. As early as 1998, David Fincher was attached to direct the project. Fincher envisioned the story as a five-hour, $80 million mini-series with film stars. However, the plan fell through and Fincher left the project and moved on to direct Zodiac.

Casting
Michael Douglas, Johnny Depp, Gabriel Byrne, and Billy Crudup were considered to play Lee Blanchard. Paul Walker, Stephen Dorff, and Chris O'Donnell were considered for Bucky Bleichert. Fairuza Balk and Tiffani Thiessen were considered for Elizabeth Short. Sherilyn Fenn, who had been the front runner for the part in the late eighties, was also a contender.

The film was originally in pre-production with David Fincher attached as director, Josh Hartnett attached to play Bucky Bleichert and Mark Wahlberg attached to play Lee Blanchard. Wahlberg was forced to drop out due to scheduling conflicts with the planned filming of The Italian Job. Fincher originally envisioned "a five-hour, $80-million mini-series with movie stars." Fincher apparently wanted Julianna Margulies for Madeleine and Jennifer Connelly for Elizabeth. Fincher eventually left the project as he felt he wasn't going to be able to make the film exactly as he had envisioned.

When De Palma became director, he replaced Wahlberg with Aaron Eckhart shortly before shooting began in April 2005. Hartnett had remained attached to the project all this time. Gwen Stefani was considered for the part of Kay Lake. Eva Green was offered the role of the evil Madeleine Linscott, but declined as she feared being typecast as a femme fatale. Kate Beckinsale, Fairuza Balk (who had previously been considered for the Dahlia) and Rachel Bilson were also considered for the part. De Palma originally wanted Maggie Gyllenhaal for Elizabeth Short, but she declined as she disliked how the murder was used as a plot device and felt that the story disrespected Short's memory. Rose McGowan auditioned for the part but was eventually cast in a minor role as Short's roommate. 

Mia Kirshner was originally hired to read lines with potential actors in the auditions; the original screenplay did not feature her character onscreen. However, De Palma, impressed by Kirshner, ultimately wrote Short's character into the film via screen test sequences and several flashbacks "where you see her life degenerating." Kirshner said she felt a tremendous responsibility to do justice to the real Elizabeth Short and to honor her memory. She made a decision not to look at the original autopsy photos and to focus on Short as she had been in life. Kirshner would receive critical acclaim for her performance.

Filming

De Palma initially intended to shoot the film in France. Production designer Dante Ferretti began designing sets for the film in Italy. Principal photography began on April 1, 2005 in Pernik and later Sofia, Bulgaria, at an estimated cost of $50 million. At the time, it was the most expensive film ever shot in the country. A standing set on the backlot of Nu Boyana Film Studios in Sofia was used to represent Leimert Park.

Only a handful of exterior scenes were filmed in Los Angeles: MacArthur Park, Pantages Theatre (and adjoining bar The Frolic Room) at Hollywood and Vine, and the Alto-Nido Apartments are perhaps the most recognizable landmarks.  

Stan Winston Studios designed some of the film's practical effects, including the prop dummy of Kirshner's corpse that appears early in the film; the dummy prop was publicly auctioned in June 2022.

Scenes from the 1928 film The Man Who Laughs also appear in the film.

Music
James Horner was originally on board the project to score the film's music but in February 2006, it was reported that Mark Isham had replaced him.

Editing 
De Palma's initial cut of the film ran over three hours long, but was cut down to a little over two hours at the insistence of the producers. Author Ellroy, who was highly critical of the released version, claims this rough cut is a superior version of the film and a more faithful adaptation of his novel.

Release

Box office
The film opened on September 15, 2006 in 2,226 theaters and came in second place over its opening weekend (behind fellow newcomer Gridiron Gang), with $10 million. It ended its theatrical run after domestically grossing $22.5 million in North America and $27.8 million in foreign countries for a global total of $49.3 million, against a budget of $50 million.

Critical response
Highly anticipated by many after the success of L.A. Confidential, the film received mixed to negative reviews from critics. At Rotten Tomatoes, the film holds an approval rating of 32%, based on 194 reviews, with an average rating of 4.85/10. The site's consensus states, "Though this ambitious noir crime-drama captures the atmosphere of its era, it suffers from subpar performances, a convoluted story, and the inevitable comparisons to other, more successful films of its genre." On Metacritic, the film has a score 49 out of 100, based on 35 critics, indicating "mixed or average reviews". On CinemaScore, audiences gave the film an average grade of "D+" on an A+ to F scale.

David Denby of The New Yorker described the film as:  Peter Travers of Rolling Stone magazine commented that "De Palma throws everything at the screen, but almost nothing sticks." J. Hoberman of The Village Voice stated that the film "rarely achieves the rhapsodic (let alone the delirious)." Jeff Simon of The Buffalo News deemed The Black Dahlia "the worst major film of the year" and " a wicked Saturday Night Live spoof of film noir," citing its casting as a substantial issue.

However, Kirshner's performance as Elizabeth was praised by many critics: Stephanie Zacharek of Salon, in a largely negative review, notes that the eponymous character was "played wonderfully by Mia Kirshner". Mick LaSalle wrote that Kirshner "makes a real impression of the Dahlia as a sad, lonely dreamer, a pathetic figure." J. R. Jones of the Chicago Reader described her performance as "haunting" and that the film's fictional screen tests "deliver the emotional darkness so lacking in the rest of the movie."

Accolades

Home media
Universal Pictures Home Entertainment released The Black Dahlia on DVD on December 26, 2006. A Blu-ray edition was issued by Universal on September 7, 2010. Mill Creek Entertainment reissued the film on Blu-ray in July 2022, though bonus materials found on the Universal disc are absent from this release.

References

Sources

External links
 
 
 
 
 A Dark Moment in the Harsh Hollywood Sun - The New York Times, February 5, 2006

2006 films
2006 crime thriller films
2006 LGBT-related films
2006 thriller drama films
American crime thriller films
American detective films
American LGBT-related films
American neo-noir films
American thriller drama films
English-language French films
English-language German films
Female bisexuality in film
Fictional portrayals of the Los Angeles Police Department
Films about murder
Films based on American crime novels
Films based on works by James Ellroy
Films directed by Brian De Palma
Films produced by Art Linson
Films scored by Mark Isham
Films set in 1947
Films set in Los Angeles
Films set in the 1940s
Films shot at Nu Boyana Film Studios
Films shot in Los Angeles
French crime thriller films
French detective films
French LGBT-related films
French neo-noir films
French thriller drama films
German crime thriller films
German detective films
German LGBT-related films
German neo-noir films
German thriller drama films
Lesbian-related films
LGBT-related thriller films
Nu Image films
Works about the Black Dahlia case
2000s English-language films
Films produced by Avi Lerner
2000s American films
2000s French films
2000s German films